Valdivia is one of the few cities in southern Chile with a more less continuous and well documented history from its foundation in the 16th century onwards.

Prehispanic times (12,000 B.P.–1543)
The site of Valdivia may have been populated since 12,000 – 11,800 B.P. according to archaeological discoveries in Monte Verde (less than 200 km south of Valdivia), which would place it about a thousand years before the Clovis culture in North America. This  has challenged the models of migration to the New World and it is possible that the first inhabitants of Valdivia and Chile travelled to America by watercraft and not across a land-bridge in the Bering Strait.

By the time of the arrival of the Spanish conquistadores, Valdivia was inhabited by Huilliches (Mapudungun for People of the South). Huilliches and Mapuches were both referred by the Spaniards as Araucanos. Their main language was a variant of Mapudungun, the Mapuche language.

There was a large village called Ainil in present-day downtown Valdivia, and the Valdivia River was called Ainilebu. Ainil seemed to have been an important trade center due to its ease of access to the sea and the interior using the river network of the Cruces and Calle-Calle Rivers, both tributaries of the Valdivia. Ainil may be described as "a kind of little Venice" as it had large areas of wetlands and canals, most of them drained or filled nowadays. The market in Ainil received shellfish and fish from the coast, legumes from Punucapa, and other foods from San José de la Mariquina; an agricultural zone north east of Valdivia. Remains of this ancient trade is the modern Feria Fluvial (English: Riverside Market) on the banks of Valdivia River. The surroundings of Valdivia were described as large plains having a large population that cultivated potatoes, maize, quinoa and legumes among other crops. He also stated that "there is not much cleared land near Valdivia" which contrasted with the description made by early Spaniards of large fields and extensive croplands.

The expansion and economic development of the city were limited in the early 19th century. To jump-start economic development, the Chilean government initiated a highly focused immigration program under Bernhard Eunom Philippi and later Vicente Pérez Rosales as government agents. Through this program, thousands of Germans settled in the area, incorporating then-modern technology and know-how to develop agriculture and industry. While immigrants that arrived to the Llanquihue area where often poor farmers, Valdivia received more educated immigrants, including political exiles and merchants. Some of the immigrants that arrived in Valdivia established workshops and built new industries. One of the most famous immigrants was Carlos Anwandter, an exile from Luckenwalde who arrived to Valdivia in 1850 and in 1858 founded Chile's first German school. Other Germans left the city and became settlers, drawn by the promise of free land. They were often given forested land, which they cleared to turn into farms. Native Mapuche and Huilliche either sold their land or were pushed into reservations. The Osorno department of Valdivia Province was moved to Llanquihue Province (created in 1853) as consequence of German immigration to the Llaquihue area.

We shall be honest and laborious Chileans as the best of them, we shall defend our adopted country joining in the ranks of our new countrymen, against any foreign oppression and with the decision and firmness of the man that defends his country, his family and his interests.  Never will have the country that adopts us as its children, reason to repent of such illustrated, human and generous proceeding,... 
- Carlos Anwandter

Valdivia prospered with industries, including shipyards, the Hoffmann gristmill, the Rudloff shoe factory, the Anwandter beer company and many more. The steel mills of Corral were the largest recorded private investment in Chile at the time, and were the first steel mills in South America. In 1891 Valdivia became a commune according to a law that created such subdivisions. After the Malleco Viaduct was built in 1890 the railroads advanced further south, reaching Valdivia in 1895. The first passenger train arrived in 1899. In 1909 a fire destroyed 18 city blocks in downtown Valdivia, which were rebuilt with modern concrete buildings. By 1911 lumber production, from clearing native forests, became the most important industry. Cattle-raising was a growing industry, and wheat was grown on the cleared lands. Lumber, cattle, leather, flour and beer were exported. In 1895 the city's population was of 8,062 inhabitants and was estimated in 9,704 as of 1902.

Valdivia, situated at some distance from the coast, on the Calle-calle river, is a German town. Everywhere you meet German faces, German signboards and placards alongside the Spanish. There is a large German school, a church and various Vereine, large shoe-factories, and, of course, breweries...
- Carl Skottsberg

The prosperity of Valdivia continued throughout the first half of the 20th century. In 1917 the first "Valdivian Week" (Spanish: Semana Valdiviana) was celebrated. Chile's oldest beauty content, "Queen of The Rivers" (Spanish: Reina de Los Ríos) began the same year. The city evolved as an early tourist center in Chile, while popular songs that named Valdivia and the Calle-Calle River made it better known in Chilean popular culture. The Pedro de Valdivia Bridge crossing the Valdivia River was built in 1954. Valdivia came to be one of the most important industrial centre in Chile together with the capital Santiago and the main port city, Valparaíso.

Great Chilean earthquake and Valdivia in Los Lagos Region (1960–2006)

On May 22, 1960, south-central Chile suffered the most powerful earthquake ever recorded, rating 9.5 on the Moment magnitude scale, with Valdivia being the most affected city. The earthquake generated devastating tsunamis that affected Japan and Hawaii. Spanish-colonial forts around Valdivia were severely damaged, while soil subsidence destroyed buildings, deepened local rivers, and created wetlands of the Río Cruces y Chorocomayo - a new aquatic park north of the city.

Large sections of the city flooded after the earthquake, and a landslide near the Tralcan Mount dammed the Riñihue Lake. Water levels in Lake Riñihue rose more than 20 meters, raising the danger of a catastrophic break and of destroying everything downriver. Government authorities drew plans for evacuating the city, but many people left on their own. Danger to the city was reduced after a large team of workers was able to open a drainage channel in the landslide, allowing water levels of the lake to slowly reduce to normal levels. There is evidence that a similar landslide and earthquake happened in 1575.

After the Great Chilean earthquake Valdivia's economy and political status declined. Much of the city was destroyed and many inhabitants left. By 1974, the military junta reorganized the political divisions of Chile and declared Valdivia a province of the Los Lagos Region with Puerto Montt as the regional capital. Many Valdivians resented the decision, and felt theirs should have been the legitimate regional capital—while Valdivia was founded in 1552, and had resisted pirate attacks, hostile natives and several earthquakes, Puerto Montt was a relatively new city founded only in 1853 (three hundred and one years later).

Since the liberalization of the economy in Chile in the 80s the forestry sector in Valdivia boomed, first by exporting wood chips to Japan from Corral and then by producing woodpulp in Mariquina (25 km northeast of Valdivia). This led to deforestation and substitution of native Valdivian temperate rainforests to plant pines and eucalyptus, but also created new jobs for people with limited education. Valdivia also benefitted from the development of salmon aquaculture in the 90s, but to a much lesser extent than places such as Puerto Montt and Chiloé.

References

Valdivia
History of Los Ríos Region
Valdivia